Lim Chu Kang is a planning area located in the northwestern part of the North Region of Singapore, bordering the Western Water Catchment to the west and south, Sungei Kadut to the east and the Straits of Johor to the north.

History
Lim Chu Kang Village was founded by Neo Ao Tiew (1884 - 1975), a Chinese immigrant from Fujian who was the sheriff of the village. "Lim" was taken from Lim Chwee Chian who was the kangchu, or leader, of the area. The village is on the banks of the Sungei Kranji and was controlled by the Lim clan. Neo Tiew also set up a primary school and health centre in the village. Neo Tiew Road is named after him. The area was originally noted for its numerous pepper and gambier plantations. Later there were rubber plantations, e.g. Namazie-Cashin rubber estates.

Ama Keng Village
Ama Keng Village (亞媽宮村) was one of the three villages in the Lim Chu Kang, together with Neo Tiew and Sungei Gedong. It takes its name from the Mazu, the goddess of the sea in 1900. In the 1950s, the government developed the bustling farming site to serve as the main food production centre. In 1980s, residents of the Ama Keng were resettled and all eventually moved out to Jurong West, Choa Chu Kang and Yew Tee. After the last resident left, on 10 April 2002, the SAF took possession of the entire Ama Keng for military training use. On 27 September 2012, an SAF serviceman died during training in the camp. After the removal of the military training area in Tengah by 2016, it became the largest training ground for the Lim Chu Kang and Keat Hong camps.

In the 1960s and 1970s, Ama Keng was well-served by shops, a police station as well as a maternity and child welfare centre. All these were closed down by 1990. The Ama Keng English School was founded in 1951 and was moved to Choa Chu Kang in 1990 and renamed to South View Primary School. The old school building became a workers' quarters and military training ground.

Neo Tiew
Neo Tiew is named after Neo Ao Tiew (梁後宙, a prominent Chinese businessman. Neo is credited with the development of the Lim Chu Kang area, where he built roads, houses and a seaport. He was also the founder and sheriff of Lim Chu Kang Village. In 1967, the British colonial government named a 3.5km stretch of road "Neo Tiew Road" or "Neo Tiew Lane" in recognition of his contributions to the area.

On 17 February 2011, most parts of Neo Tiew became a military training area.

Sungei Gedong
In the 1960s, Sungei Gedong Road was lined with shophouses and cinemas. A major plan by the government to move residents into HDB flats have seen the decline of the small town. A small HDB estate which was opposite Lim Chu Kang Road was built in the early 1980s, but had been cleared by the late 1990s and expanded the Sungei Gedong Camp's military training area in 2000s.

On 11 July 2001, SAF took possession of the entire Sungei Gedong for military training area.

Lim Chu Kang Bus Terminal
In the 1980s, Lim Chu Kang Road End Bus Terminal was served by Services 172 (to Shenton Way Bus Terminal and later shortened to loop at Jalan Anak Bukit) and 206 (to Jurong Bus Interchange and later amended to Boon Lay Bus Interchange.)

On 3 January 1993, route 172 was amended to Boon Lay Interchange. On 18 July 1993, new service 175 was introduced from Lim Chu Kang to Upper Bukit Timah Road (Loop) replacing route 206 which was withdrawn. In 2005 service 175 was shortened to Bukit Panjang, amended to loop at the Lim Chu Kang Road End and renumbered service 975. The bus stop is renamed as Police Coast Guard.

Today
Today, Lim Chu Kang is still largely rural and is located in close proximity with the Western Water Catchment. Lim Chu Kang is served by two main roads known as Lim Chu Kang Road and Old Choa Chu Kang Road. As this area is still undeveloped, its land use primarily consists of military training areas, agriculture, farms, the only remaining cemeteries in Singapore (due to exhumations in others to make way for new developments) and a major cinerarium. There are also side-roads, like Jalan Sungei Poyan, Lim Chu Kang Road Track 11/13 and Jalan Bahtera.

The area will not be used for residential purposes in the near future or in the Land Use Plan 2030. Rather, it will largely retain its agricultural and military value. The 62 farms in the western part of Lim Chu Kang are being cleared progressively from April 2020 and completing in December 2022, to make way for military training areas.

Various types of farms where sustainable agriculture is practiced such as vegetable, goat and crocodile farms give city dwellers an insight on nature. It has also been an increasingly popular exploration for tourists in recent years, due in part to its close proximity to the Kranji MRT station.

Ama Keng Chinese Temple
The Ama Keng Chinese Temple (亞媽宮) in Lim Chu Kang was built in 1900 to worship Mazu, the holy mother, a goddess of peace and happiness. Ama means "grandmother" in Teochew and Hokkien, and keng means "temple". The "incense ashes" of this temple were brought in from Wak Hai Cheng Bio Temple  (粵海清廟), the oldest Teochew temple in Singapore. The first temple was made of attap. The temple was renovated in 1943 with a zinc roof and timber. In 1965, it was redeveloped with a tiled roof, and the renovations cost S$16,000. The temple holds wayang performances a few times a year. In the late 1980s, the government acquired the temple's land for military purposes. The temple committee, residents and devotees attempted to petition against the acquisition without success, and the temple was eventually demolished.

Lim Chu Kang Rural Centre
In 1979, a Housing Development Board estate was constructed in Neo Tiew. In addition to public housing units, a wet market and an old playground were also constructed in this estate. In 2002, the entire estate was sold back to the government in an en-bloc sale; its residents moved to newly built housing units in Jurong West. The remains of the old housing estate are currently used by the Singapore Armed Forces for their Fighting in Built-Up Areas (FIBUA) training from 2004, which has restricted access and only accessible from the Sungei Gedong Camp (TRMC) Operations Room. In 2012, the site was used for the shooting of a war scene in the film, Ah Boys to Men.

References

 
Places in Singapore
West Region, Singapore
Western Water Catchment
Hokkien place names